Hani Alnakhli (born 14 March 1986) is a Saudi Arabian athlete who competes in disability athletics in the F33 category. In Guangzhou for the 2010 Asian Para Games, Alnakhli won the gold medal in a combined F32–34 class for the discus and set a new world record for the F33 category. At the 2011 Paralympic World Cup in Manchester, Alnakhli broke his world F33 record for the discus. Alnakhli again broke his world record at the London Paralympic Games as he won silver in a combined F32/33/34 class. At the 2013 World championships, Alnakhli set a championship record for the F33 class but had to settle for bronze in a combined F32-34 event.

References

World record holders in Paralympic athletics
1986 births
Living people
Saudi Arabian male discus throwers
Medalists at the 2012 Summer Paralympics
Athletes (track and field) at the 2012 Summer Paralympics
Paralympic silver medalists for Saudi Arabia
Saudi Arabian people with disabilities
Sportsmen with disabilities
Track and field athletes with cerebral palsy
Medalists at the 2016 Summer Paralympics
Paralympic medalists in athletics (track and field)
Paralympic athletes of Saudi Arabia